"When I'm Alone" is a single from Catching a Tiger, American folk rock singer Lissie's debut album. The song was written in London with Jim Irvin and Julian Emery, who also collaborated with Lissie on the singles "In Sleep" and "Cuckoo". It was released on June 18, 2010 for digital download and serves as the debut single in the UK & Ireland.

In December 2010 it was selected as iTunes UK's Song Of The Year.

The song was also featured in the end credits of the 2014 comedy Dumb and Dumber To, starring Jim Carrey and Jeff Daniels and also in episode 10 of third season on Loudermilk tv series.

Track listing

Chart performance
"When I'm Alone" entered the UK Singles Chart on June 27, 2010, at number 55, it dropped to number 68 the next week and in its third week to dropped to number 92.

Certifications

References 

2010 singles
Songs written by Jim Irvin
Songs written by Julian Emery
2010 songs
Columbia Records singles
Song recordings produced by Jacquire King